Baise (Bose) Bama Airport , formerly Baise (Bose) Youjiang Airport, is a dual-use military and civilian airport serving Baise (or Bose) in Guangxi Zhuang Autonomous Region, China.  The airport is located in Tianyang County,  from the city center.  It was first built in 1965 as the military Tianyang Airport.  Expansion of the airport was started in 2005 with an investment of 57 million yuan, and it was reopened as Baise Youjiang Airport in December 2006. On 8 September 2013 it was renamed to Bama Airport.

Airlines and destinations

See also
List of airports in China
List of the busiest airports in China
List of People's Liberation Army Air Force airbases

References

Airports in Guangxi
Chinese Air Force bases
Airports established in 2006
2006 establishments in China